Beasley Broadcast Group, Inc., based in Naples, Florida, is an owner/operator of radio stations in the United States.  , the company owned 63 stations under the Beasley Media Group name.

History
The company was founded in 1961 by George G. Beasley.  On February 11, 2000 the group completed its IPO.

On October 2, 2014, CBS Radio announced that it would trade 14 radio stations located in Tampa, Florida, Charlotte, North Carolina and Philadelphia, Pennsylvania to the Beasley Broadcast Group in exchange for 5 stations located in Miami and Philadelphia. The swap was completed on December 1, 2014.

On January 15, 2015, Beasley reorganized its radio stations, previously held by various subsidiaries, into Beasley Media Group; the Beasley Broadcast Group name was retained for the parent company.

On July 19, 2016, Beasley announced that it would acquire Greater Media for $240 million. The FCC approved the sale on October 6, and the sale closed on November 1. The deal gave Beasley additional stations in the Philadelphia and Boston markets and expanded the company into Detroit and three New Jersey markets.

On February 2, 2017, Beasley announced that it would sell its six stations and four translators in the Greenville-New Bern-Jacksonville, North Carolina market to Curtis Media Group for $11 million to reduce the company's debt; one of the stations, WNCT-FM, was concurrently divested to Inner Banks Media to comply with FCC ownership limits. The sale was completed on May 1, 2017.

On November 1, 2017, as part of the Entercom-CBS Radio merger, Beasley announced that it would sell AC-formatted station WMJX in Boston to Entercom, in exchange for all sports-formatted station WBZ-FM, also in Boston. The sale was completed on December 20, 2017.

On July 19, 2018, Entercom announced that it would sell WXTU in Philadelphia back to Beasley Broadcast Group for $38 million (in order to comply with DOJ revenue limits), as part of its purchase of market-leading WBEB also in Philadelphia. The deal was completed on September 28.

On November 14, 2019, Beasley Broadcast Group announced the acquisition of the Houston Outlaws, a professional Overwatch esports team that competes in the Overwatch League, from Immortals Gaming Club. The purchase marked the company's third esports venture.

On August 22, 2021, Beasley became owners of a Rocket League organization called AXLE-R8. Four players where selected from a gauntlet where teams would compete in an open qualifier to eventually try and win a 1 year contract from Beasley.

Stations by state
Arizona: KCYE, KOAS
Delaware: WJBR-FM
Florida: WBCN, WHFS, WJPT, WLLD, WPBB, WQYK-FM, WRBQ-FM, WRXK-FM, WWCN, WXKB, WYUU.
Georgia: WAEC, WCHZ-FM, WDRR, WGAC, WGAC-FM, WWWE.
Massachusetts: WBOS, WBQT, WBZ-FM, WKLB-FM, WRCA, WROR-FM.
Michigan: WCSX, WDMK, WMGC-FM, WRIF.
New Jersey: WCTC, WDHA-FM, WJRZ-FM, WMGQ, WMTR, WPEN, WRAT, WTMR.
Nevada: KKLZ, KVGS, KXTE
North Carolina: WAZZ, WBAV-FM, WFLB, WKML, WKQC, WNKS, WPEG, WSOC-FM, WUKS, WZFX
Pennsylvania: WBEN-FM, WMGK, WMMR, WTEL, WWDB, WXTU.
South Carolina: WGUS-FM, WHHD, WKXC-FM.

References

External links

Radio broadcasting companies of the United States
Mass media companies established in 1961
Beasley Broadcast Group radio stations
Companies listed on the Nasdaq
1961 establishments in North Carolina
Companies based in Naples, Florida
2000 initial public offerings